Arielli (language: [Abruzzese]) is a village and comune in the province of Chieti, Abruzzo, central-eastern Italy, located on a hill overlooking the spring area of the homonymous river.

Its territory is  hilly, rich in vineyards and olive groves.

Arielli was on the Gustav Line during WW2.
It is also the birthplace of famous Brigante Nunziato Di Mecola.

Main sights
Church of Madonna delle Grazie, with a terracotta statue of the Holy Mary dating from the 1590.
Church of San Rocco (12th century)
Church of San Michele Arcangelo

References

Cities and towns in Abruzzo